

21st century

2001

2002

2003

2004

2005

2006

2007

2008

2009

2010

2011

2012

2013

2014

2015

2016

2017

2018

2019

2020

2021

2022

2023

See also 
List of wars: 2003–present

References

2001
2000s conflicts
2010s conflicts